WFOX may refer to:

WFOX (FM), a radio station (95.9 FM) licensed to Southport, Connecticut, United States
WFOX-LP, a low-power radio station (104.3 FM) licensed to serve Sandy Springs, South Carolina, United States
WFOX-TV, a TV station (channel 14, virtual 30) licensed to Jacksonville, Florida, United States
WSRV, a radio station (97.1 FM) licensed to Gainesville, Georgia, United States which used the WFOX call letters until 2006